Crestwood Preparatory College is a co-ed, non-semestered high school in Toronto, Ontario. Located in the former Brookbanks Public School property, Crestwood Preparatory College is owned by Toronto Lands Corporation (a real estate arm of the Toronto District School Board).

History
Crestwood initially began in 1980 with seven students at Eglinton and Bathurst. Five years later, 70 Crestwood students moved into a Victorian house on Prince Arthur Avenue. In 1990, Crestwood had 360 students (Junior Kindergarten to Grade 6) and moved to its current location at Bayview and Lawrence.

In the spring of 2001, Vince Pagano became Director of the newly established upper school, Crestwood Preparatory College (Grades 7 to 12), and oversaw the physical expansion of the new building.  In September 2001, Crestwood Preparatory College opened at its current site, near York Mills and the Don Valley Parkway. It now enrolls a total of 510 students.

Sports
Crestwood Preparatory College is well known for its sports facilities. Crestwood's main sport that they are known for is basketball, although they do have many other ones such as swimming, soccer, curling, and badminton. 
Crestwood participates in CISAA.

Notable alumni
 Dougie Hamilton, ice hockey defenceman for the New Jersey Devils
 Freddie Hamilton, ice hockey centre currently an unrestricted free agent
 Jamie Oleksiak, ice hockey defenceman for the Seattle Kraken
 Emmanuel Zambazis, association football midfielder for Iraklis F.C. and Canada men's national under-20 soccer team
 Jordan Binnington, NHL goalie for the St Louis Blues
 Aaliyah Edwards, Basketball player for UConn Huskies women's basketball and Canadian Women's Basketball at the 2020 Olympics
 Elijah Fisher, Basketball player for Texas Tech Red Raiders basketball

See also
List of high schools in Ontario

Notes

References 
 "History-Crestwood." Crestwood. Web. 12 Dec. 2016.
 "Crestwood Clubs and Activities."

Educational institutions established in 2001
High schools in Toronto
Middle schools in Toronto
Preparatory schools in Ontario
Private schools in Toronto
Schools in the TDSB
2001 establishments in Ontario